Ali Haghdoost (born May 6, 1985) is an Iranian footballer who plays for Saipa F.C. in the Iranian Premier League.

Club career

Haghdoost joined Saipa F.C. in 2010, after spending the previous 5 seasons at F.C. Aboomoslem.

 Assist Goals

References

1985 births
Living people
Iranian footballers
Saipa F.C. players
F.C. Aboomoslem players
Persian Gulf Pro League players
Association football midfielders